Belvest is an Italian menswear fashion brand founded in 1964 in Piazzola sul Brenta from the desire of the founder to respond to a specific need of the time, the "ready-made garment", without abandoning haute couture. Its 300 employees produce ready-to-wear garments that respect the canons of the sartorial tradition.

See also 

 Italian fashion
 Made in Italy

References

External links
 Official website

Clothing companies of Italy
Luxury brands
High fashion brands
Italian suit makers
Clothing companies established in 1964
Italian companies established in 1964
Companies based in Veneto